Velaiilla Pattadhari popularly referred to as VIP is the soundtrack album, composed by Anirudh Ravichander of the 2014 Tamil film of the same name starring Dhanush and Amala Paul in the lead roles, while Saranya Ponvannan, Samuthirakani and Surbhi portray supporting roles. This film marks the second collaboration of Anirudh with Dhanush, after his debut film 3 (2012). The film's soundtrack was launched on 14 February 2014 to positive response from critics and audiences.

Production 
Anirudh Ravichander's inclusion was confirmed during mid-July 2013 and by August, he had completed recording for two of the tracks. The soundtrack album featured eight songs, and lyrics for all the tracks were written by Dhanush. Both Anirudh and Dhanush had crooned the vocals for all of the tracks. Veteran playback singer S. Janaki recorded for "Amma Amma" along with Dhanush. In 2017, at the annual cultural festival Saarang held in IIT Madras, Anirudh who participated in the event had said about the composition of "Udhungada Sangu", saying that when he met his former girlfriend at a bar, he went home straight and had composed the track.

Marketing and release 
The soundtrack album was initially scheduled to be released on 3 January 2014, but was postponed to February, as Anirudh needed to work on two more songs in the album. The audio rights were acquired by Dhanush's newly formed music label Wunderbar Studios, a subsidiary of the production company Wunderbar Films, along with Divo, a newly formed digital streaming portal which is their first venture. 

The tracklist was unveiled on 10 February 2014, in a form of a video teaser with the film's title theme song through YouTube. The complete album was launched on 14 February 2014 (Valentine's Day), at the Suryan FM 93.5 Radio Station, Chennai with Dhanush, Amala Paul and Anirudh Ravichander in attendance.  Upon release, the album eventually topped the iTunes charts, becoming his fourth consecutive album, since 3 (2012), Ethir Neechal and Vanakkam Chennai (2013). Anirudh promoted the album on Sun Music on 11 July 2014, a week before the film's release. The songs "Velaiilla Pattadhari", "Poo Indru Neeyaga", "What a Karuvad" and "Udhungada Sangu" topped the Radio Mirchi South charts for 31 weeks.

Track listing

Critical reception 
Srinivasa Ramanujam of The Times of India gave the album 3 out of 5 stars, saying that some of the songs sounded similar to Anirudh's previous compositions. He criticised the use of only two male singers (Dhanush and Anirudh), stating that "other voices might have provided a fresher musical perspective to some of the tunes". Behindwoods rated the album 3.5 out of 5, stating that "Velaiyilla Pattathari is a solid album from the Anirudh Ravichander- Dhanush combination". Moviecrow rated the album 7.5/10, stating that "Anirudh's consistency is mind boggling so far with 4 out of 4 chartbuster hit albums. Anirudh is proving that he is truly a prodigy, at least so far. What's amazing is all his 4 movies are for new directors and 2 out of 4 movies for emerging heroes such as Sivakarthikeyan and Siva. Just imagine what this young talent could do as he starts working with accomplished directors and actors in 2014." Indiaglitz rated 3.25 out of 5 stating "The effort that went into the album's creation is evident and the success is the proof. Kudos to the entire team of VIP for a promising album." Karthik Srinivasan of Milliblog called it as a "Fun musical outing by Anirudh and Dhanush". Siddharth Srinivas of Only Kollywood gave 3.5 out of 5 stars saying "Though the tunes are resembling a bit with Anirudh's earlier ones, this is an yet another sensational album for him to kick start this year!" Kaushik LM called the album as "a chartbuster treat" but felt that few songs missed the mark.Awards and nominations

Album credits 
Credits adapted from CD liner notes

Producer 
Anirudh Ravichander

Songwriters 

 Anirudh Ravichander (Composer, Arranger) 
 Dhanush (Lyrics)

Performers 
Anirudh Ravichander, Dhanush, S. Janaki

Musicians 

 Guitars - Keba Jeremiah, Sajith Satya, R. Prasanna, Rex Vijayan, Godfray Immanuel
 Bass - Naveen
 Tavil - Sundhar
 Tabla - MT Aditya Srinivasan
 Ganjeera - S. Swaminathan
 Nadaswaram - D. Balasubramani
 Indian Rhythm & Percussions - Krishna Kishore
 Flute - Kareem Kamlakhar, Naveen Kumar
 Piano, Keyboards, Synth, Rhythm and Electronic Programming - Anirudh Ravichander
 Additional Rhythm Programming - Shashank Vijay

Additional Vocals 
Veena Murali, Deepthi Suresh, Sowmya, Deepak Blue, Aravind Srinivas, Maalavika Sundar, Niranjana Ramanan, Narayanan, Keba Jeremiah, Lavita Lobo, Inno Genga, Sajith Satya, Vinay Sridhar, Nadisha Thomas, Kavitha Thomas, Sanjana Rajnarayan, Shenbagaraj

Beatbox - Hardee Bee

Orchestral Programming - Ishaan Chhabra

Vocal Arrangement - Arjun Chandy

Sound Engineers 

 Albuquerque Records, Chennai - Srinivasan, Ananthakrrishnan, Pradeep Kannan, Manoj
 AM Studios, Chennai - S. Sivakumar, Hari Dafusia Pawan CH, Ishaan Chhabra, AH Kaashif

Production 

 Music Advisor - Ananthakrrishnan 
 Creative Consultant - Sajith Satya 
 Music Supervisor - Harish Raam L. H. 
 Mixed by - Vinay Sridhar 
 Mastered by Shadab Rayeen at New Edge Studios, Mumbai 
 MfiT - S. Sivakumar 
 Music Coordinator - Samidurai, Velavan

Notes

References 

Tamil film soundtracks
2014 soundtrack albums
Anirudh Ravichander soundtracks